Oda (written:  or ) is a Japanese surname. Notable people with the surname include:

Nobuhide Oda (1510–1551), Japanese warlord and magistrate of lower Owari Province
Nobunaga Oda (1534–1582), initiator of the unification of Japan under the shogunate
Nobutada Oda (1557–1582), Japanese samurai, eldest son of Nobunaga Oda
Nobukatsu Oda (1558–1630), Japanese samurai, second son of Nobunaga Oda
Hidenobu Oda (1580–1605), son of Nobutada Oda
Sakunosuke Oda (1913–1947), Japanese writer
Ben Oda (1915–1984), Japanese-American comics letterer
Bev Oda (born 1944), Canadian politician
, Japanese gymnast
Eiichirō Oda (born 1975), Japanese manga artist, author of One Piece
, Japanese volleyball player
Kazumasa Oda (born 1947), Japanese singer-songwriter and composer
, Japanese general
, Japanese World War II flying ace
Nobunari Oda (born 1987), Japanese figure skater
Sakura Oda (born 1999), Japanese singer, member of Morning Musume
Shigeru Oda (born 1924), Japanese jurist, judge on the International Court of Justice from 1975 to 2003
Sophie Tamiko Oda (born 1997), American actress
, Japanese speed skater
Tetsuji Oda, Japanese engineer
Tetsurō Oda (born 1958), Japanese composer, record producer, and singer-songwriter
Yūji Oda, (born 1967), Japanese actor and singer
, Japanese ice hockey player
Yūsei Oda, (born 1969), Japanese voice actor

Fictional characters
Nobuna Oda, the main female protagonist in The Ambition of Oda Nobuna
Toshinori Oda, a character in Battle Royale
Joseph Oda, a character from the video game The Evil Within
Tatsumasa Oda, a character in Slam Dunk

See also
Oda clan, a Japanese feudal clan from the Muromachi/Sengoku period

Japanese-language surnames